The University of Łódź (Polish: Uniwersytet Łódzki, Latin: Universitas Lodziensis) is a public research university founded in 1945 in Łódź, Poland, as a continuation of three higher education institutions functioning in Łódź in the interwar period — the Teacher Training Institute (1921–1928), the Higher School of Social and Economic Sciences (1924–1928) and the local division of the Free Polish University of Warsaw (1928–1939).

The University of Łódź (alternative spelling: University of Lodz) is a fully accredited, state-owned, traditional university. It is one of 18 institutions of its type in Poland.

It has more than 25,000 students and 2,600 teachers. Its international cooperation includes 385 partner institutions from all over the world. A range of BA, MA, and postgraduate courses held in English as a language of instruction are offered to Polish and overseas students.

Reputation

The university strives to maintain its high academics standards, the most recent testimonies of which include:
 3rd place among Polish universities for the quality of instruction in Economic Sciences, as shown in the 2011 ranking by the Gazeta Bankowa (a respected Polish finance & banking newspaper)
 2nd place among Polish universities for qualifying future lawyers, such as legal counsels, and civil law notaries, as shown in the 2010 ranking by the Polish Ministry of Justice
 4th place among Polish higher education institutions of international prestige, as concluded from the outcomes of QS and Webometrics rankings of 2010

Library 
The library of the University of Łódź is one of the biggest and most modern academic libraries in Central Europe. 
Its total collection amounts to 3 million volumes. The main part of the book collection is in library store-rooms. The remaining books and journals are placed in the reference sections: the Main Reading Room and Study Rooms. Registered users can use self checkout machines for lending and returning books in some collections. Apart from the Main University Library there are 106 branch libraries and their collections are adjusted to the scientific and didactic activities of the institutions. The number of registered library card holders is now over 20,000.

International cooperation

As a result of widespread cooperation with universities all over the world, including Université Jean Moulin Lyon 3, Université François – Rabelais (Tours), University of Texas at Austin, Westfälische Wilhelms – Universität Münster, University of Baltimore, the R. H. Smith School of Business, University of Maryland, Centria University of Applied Sciences (Kokkola, Finland), and the Towson University, students of the university can graduate with dual diplomas.

Authorities
Current term (2016-2020):

 Rector of the University of Łódź (President) – Prof. Elżbieta Żądzińska
 Vice-Rector for International Co-operation – Prof. Łukasz Bogucki
 Vice-Rector for Scientific Research – Prof. Zbigniew Kmieciak
 Vice-Rector for Student Affairs – dr hab. Robert Zakrzewski, prof. UŁ
 Vice-Rector for External Relations – dr hab. Agnieszka Kurczewska, prof. UŁ

Rector
 Tadeusz Kotarbiński – 1945-1949
 Józef Chałasiński – 1949-1952
 Jan Szczepański – 1952-1956
 Adam Szpunar – 1956-1962
 Stefan Hrabec – 1962-1965
 Józef Stanisław Piątowski – 1965-1968
 Andrzej Nadolski – 1968-1969
 Zdzisław Skwarczyński – 1969-1972
 Janusz Górski – 1972-1975
 Romuald Skowroński – 1975-1981
 Jerzy Wróblewski  – 1981-1984
 Leszek Wojtczak – 1984-1990
 Michał Seweryński – 1990-1996
 Stanisław Liszewski – 1996-2002
 Wiesław Puś – 2002-2008
 Włodzimierz Nykiel – 2008-2016
 Antoni Różalski – 2016-2020
 Elżbieta Żądzińska – 2020-

Faculties

Notable alumni 

Other notable alumni include:
 Cezary Grabarczyk (born 1960), politician, former Minister of Infrastructure
 Jerzy Jarniewicz (born 1958), poet, literary critic, translator and essayist, winner of the 2022 Nike Award
 Antonina Kłoskowska (1919–2001), sociologist, member of the Polish Academy of Sciences (PAN), president of the Polish Sociological Association
 Jerzy Kropiwnicki (born 1945), right-wing politician, former Mayor of Łódź
 Tatiana Okupnik (born 1978), singer, composer and songwriter, former member of Blue Café
 Władysław Pasikowski (born 1959), film director and screenwriter, known for movies Pigs, Aftermath, Jack Strong, Operacja Samum
 Karolina Pawliczak (born 1976), lawyer and politician
 Jacek Saryusz-Wolski (born 1948), diplomat, politician and an MEP: member of the European Parliament (elected on 13 June 2004)
 Krzysztof Skiba (born 1964), musician, singer-songwriter, satirist, essayist and actor; member of the rock band Big Cyc
 Joanna Skrzydlewska (born 1977), politician and a Member of the European Parliament
 Magdalena Śniadecka-Kotarska (born 1952), ethno-political researcher and diplomat (Ambassador of Poland to Peru)
 Piotr Trzaskalski (born 1964), film director and screenwriter, known for movies Edi, My Father's Bike
 Marcin Tybura (born 1985), professional Mixed Martial Artist, current UFC Heavyweight
 Anita Werner (born 1978), television journalist, and former actress
 Janusz Wojciechowski (born 1958), politician and a Member of the European Parliament and an EU Commissioner for Agriculture
 Aleksandra Ziolkowska-Boehm (born 1949), writer, author of biographic books

Other units 
Alexis de Tocqueville Center for Political and Legal Thought
The School of Polish for Foreigners - first school of Polish for foreigners in Poland, since 1952
Branch in Tomaszów Mazowiecki

Origins
The university was created after the total destruction of Warsaw, during and after the Warsaw Uprising, and after the expulsion of Poles from Lviv. One of its leading founders was Professor Teodor Vieweger of the Free Polish University. During the first year of operation (1945-1946 academic year), the University of Lodz admitted over 7 thousand students and it was divided into 6 Faculties (including the schools of pharmacy, medicine and odontology that formed a separate institution in 1950), which were later divided into the present 12 Faculties. In 1998, a branch campus of the University of Lodz was created in Tomaszów Mazowiecki.

Gallery

References

External links 

 

 
Educational institutions established in 1945
Public universities
1945 establishments in Poland